The battles of Voznesensk were a series of military engagements between Russia and Ukraine that occurred as part of the southern Ukraine campaign during the 2022 Russian invasion of Ukraine in early March 2022.

After capturing the city of Kherson, Russian forces advanced west towards the city of Mykolaiv. While Russian forces attacked Mykolaiv, a Russian column detached and pushed north, engaging Ukrainian forces twice at the small city of Voznesensk. The city was considered strategically significant to Russian forces due to having a bridge across the Southern Bug river and its proximity to the South Ukraine Nuclear Power Plant.

First battle 
On 2 March 2022, elements of the 126th Coastal Defence Brigade of the Russian Black Sea Fleet advanced northwest towards the city of Voznesensk from Mykolaiv, attempting to find a crossing over the Southern Bug river. The Russian column was alleged to have consisted of 400 men and 43 vehicles.

Russian forces initiated the battle by shelling the city, damaging several buildings. Russian snipers created nests in several houses in the village, and Russian forces set up a base at a local gas station. A Russian APC fired at the local Territorial Defense Forces base, killing several Ukrainian soldiers. Russian forces were unable to push into Voznesensk. Ukrainian artillery began shelling Russian positions, preventing Russian artillery from setting up their mortars.

By nightfall, Russian tanks began firing into Voznesensk, but retreated after being met with counterfire. Concurrently, Ukrainian forces continued to shell Russian positions, destroying some Russian vehicles. Ukrainian soldiers advanced on foot, attacking Russian vehicles with American-supplied FGM-148 Javelin missiles, destroying at least three tanks. Ukrainian forces were also able to down a Russian Mil Mi-24 attack helicopter. Russian forces fully retreated on 3 March, abandoning equipment and vehicles. During their retreat, Russian artillery shelled Rakove, hitting a clinic. Russian forces also looted the village. The Russian column retreated  to the southeast.

In total, 30 Russian vehicles, including some tanks, were abandoned. Among them, Ukrainian forces were able to salvage 15 tanks. Local officials stated that around 100 Russian soldiers were killed and 10 were captured. Ukrainian forces suffered some casualties, mainly among the Territorial Defense Forces. 12 civilians were killed during the battle.

Second battle 
On 9 March, Russian forces conducted another attack on Voznesensk. Ukrainian forces set up a defense position near the destroyed bridge. The following day, Russian forces captured the city. Ukrainian forces recaptured Voznesensk three days later on 13 March. By 18 March, Ukrainian counterattacks around the area had pushed the Russians 120 kilometres back from the city.

The local Ukrainian forces continued to fortify the city after the second assault, believing that Russian forces would continue their attacks.

References 

Voznesensk
Southern Ukraine campaign
March 2022 events in Ukraine
History of Mykolaiv Oblast